Mohammad Darabi is an Iranian football midfielder who plays for Malavan in the Iran Pro League.

Club career

Shahrdari Yasuj
Darabi started his career with Shahrdari Yasuj at youth level. In summer 2012 he was promoted to the first team. In his second season, he played as a regular starter but he could not prevent his club from being relegated.

Malavan
After success in a technical test he was accepted by Nosrat Irandoost and signed a 3-year contract with Malavan. He made his debut for Malavan in the 2014–15 Iran Pro League against Tractor Sazi as a substitute for Abolhassan Jafari.

Club career statistics

References

External links
 Mohammad Darabi at IranLeague.ir
 Mohammad Darabi at PersianLeague.com

Living people
Iranian footballers
Zagros Yasuj F.C. players
Malavan players
1992 births
Association football midfielders
People from Yasuj